Baron Killarney was a title in the Peerage of the United Kingdom that has been created twice. The first creation came on 24 May 1892 as a substantive title by Queen Victoria for her grandson Prince George, Duke of York. George was also created Duke of York and Earl of Inverness, on the same day. In 1910 upon his ascension as King George V, his titles merged with the crown. The second creation came on 24 May 1920, as a substantive title by King George V for his son Prince Albert, Duke of York. Albert was also created Duke of York and Earl of Inverness, on the same day. Upon King Edward VIII's abdication in 1936, Albert's titles merged with the crown, upon his coronation as King George VI.

It is named after the town and civil parish of Killarney, County Kerry, Republic of Ireland.

Baron Killarney; first creation (1892)

| George Frederick Ernest AlbertHouse of Saxe-Coburg and Gotha1892–1910
| 
| 3 June 1865Marlborough Houseson of Edward VII and Alexandra of Denmark
| Mary of Teck6 July 18936 children
| 20 January 1936Sandringham House, Sandringhamaged 70
|-
| colspan=5|Prince George succeeded as King George V in 1910 upon his father's death, and his titles merged with the crown.
|-
|}

Baron Killarney, second creation (1920)

| George VIHouse of Windsor1920–1936also: Duke of York and Earl of Inverness (1920)
| 
| 14 December 1895Sandringham House, Sandringhamson of King George V and Queen Mary
| Elizabeth Bowes-Lyon26 April 19232 children
| 6 February 1952Sandringham House, Sandringhamaged 56
|-
| colspan=5|George VI succeeded as King in 1936 upon his brother's abdication, and his titles merged with the crown.
|-
|}

References 

British and Irish peerages which merged in the Crown
Extinct baronies in the Peerage of the United Kingdom
Noble titles created in 1892
Noble titles created in 1920